Theodore Jones may refer to:

 Theodore A. Jones (1912–2001), insurance executive
 Theodore S. Jones (1919–1976), Wisconsin State Assemblyman
 Theodore T. Jones (born 1944), New York State Court of Appeals judge
 Ted Joans (1928–2003), American jazz poet; his birth name
 Young Greatness (Theodore Joseph Jones III, 1984–2018), American rapper
 One of the discoverers of the Baltimore gold hoard, 1934

See also
 Ted Jones (disambiguation)